Rana Muhammad Iqbal Harnah is a Pakistani politician who was a Member of the Provincial Assembly of the Punjab, from 2008 to May 2018.

Early life
He was born on 1 January 1937 in Sialkot.

Political career
He was elected to the Provincial Assembly of the Punjab as a candidate of Pakistan Muslim League (N) (PML-N) from Constituency PP-121 (Sialkot-I) in by-polls held in July 2008. He received 35,805 votes and defeated Chaudhry Sagheer Sultan, an independent candidate.

He was re-elected to the Provincial Assembly of the Punjab as a candidate of PML-N from Constituency PP-121 (Sialkot-I) in 2013 Pakistani general election.

References

Living people
Punjab MPAs 2013–2018
Punjab MPAs 2008–2013
1937 births
Pakistan Muslim League (N) politicians